Henry Eli Staley (November 3, 1866 – January 12, 1910) was an American professional baseball player who pitched in the major leagues from 1888 to 1895. He played for the Boston Beaneaters, Pittsburgh Alleghenys/Pirates, Pittsburgh Burghers, and St. Louis Browns. On June 1, 1893, in a game against the Louisville Colonels, Staley had nine runs batted in, a record for most RBIs in a game by a pitcher. The record stood for over 70 years until equaled by Atlanta Braves pitcher Tony Cloninger in 1966.

References

External links

1866 births
1910 deaths
19th-century baseball players
Major League Baseball pitchers
Boston Beaneaters players
Pittsburgh Alleghenys players
Pittsburgh Burghers players
Pittsburgh Pirates players
St. Louis Browns (NL) players
St. Louis Whites players
Wheeling (minor league baseball) players
Toronto Canadians players
Albany Senators players
Toronto Canucks players
Norfolk Jewels players
Schenectady Electricians players
Baseball players from Illinois
Sportspeople from Jacksonville, Illinois